Andrew Joseph "Drew" Butler (born May 10, 1989) is a former American football punter. He played college football for the University of Georgia and was recognized as a unanimous All-American punter. The Pittsburgh Steelers signed him as an undrafted free agent following the 2012 NFL Draft.

Early years
Butler was born in Duluth, Georgia, and is the son of Kevin Butler, a former University of Georgia and NFL placekicker.  He attended Peachtree Ridge High School in Suwanee, Georgia, and played high school football for the Peachtree Ridge Lions. As a junior, he averaged 40 yards per punt with a longest kick of 63 yards and 13 punts inside the 20-yard line. Following his senior season in 2006, The Atlanta Journal-Constitution and the Georgia Sports Writers Association named him to their Class 5A all-state first-teams. Scout.com rated him as the No. 9 punter recruit in the nation. He also played Peachtree Ridge Lions golf team, while maintaining a 3.9 grade point average.

College career
Butler attended the University of Georgia, where he played for coach Mark Richt's Georgia Bulldogs football team from 2007 to 2011.  He led the nation in punting average for the 2009 NCAA Division I FBS football season. He was selected as the first-team All-Southeastern Conference (SEC) punter, and a unanimous first-team All-American, and he was the winner of the Ray Guy Award recognizing him as the best college punter in the nation.

In 2010, Butler was selected as the second-team All-SEC punter by the coaches. He was a first-team All-American selection by Pro Football Weekly, a second-team choice by the Associated Press and CBS Sports, as well as an honorable mention selection by Sports Illustrated. Butler was once again a finalist for the Ray Guy Award in 2010. He was a 2010 first-team Academic All-America selection.

On December 6, 2011, he was honored as a National Football Foundation (NFF) Scholar-Athlete Award recipient, named a finalist for the William V. Campbell Trophy. He was also honored on that same day when he earned honorable mention All-SEC recognition by the Associated Press. On December 8, he repeated in 2011 as a first-team Academic All-America selection.

Professional career

Pittsburgh Steelers
On April 28, 2012, following the 2012 NFL Draft, Butler was one of 12 undrafted free agent rookies signed by the Pittsburgh Steelers. During the 2012 season, Butler punted 77 times, and averaged 43.8 yards. For the 2013 NFL season he beat Brian Moorman in preseason to make the 53-man roster.

Chicago Bears
On December 31, 2013, Butler was signed to a future/reserve contract by the Chicago Bears. On May 18, Butler was released.

Detroit Lions
On July 25, 2014, Butler was signed by the Detroit Lions. The Lions released Butler on August 25, 2014.

Arizona Cardinals
The Cardinals signed Butler on September 8, 2014. Butler made his debut for the Cardinals later that same day in their 2014 season opener against the San Diego Chargers on ESPN's Monday Night Football. He was released on September 16, 2014. He was re-signed by the Cardinals on September 19, 2014. On October 6, 2014, he became the starting punter after Dave Zastudil was placed on season-ending injured reserve. Butler went on to lead the NFL in punts inside the 20 during the 2014 season.

On October 4, 2016, Butler was released by the Cardinals. He was re-signed on November 15, 2016 and released again on December 13, 2016.

Career statistics

Regular season

Postseason

Post-playing career
Butler runs 4th Down Consulting and hosts a pair of college football podcasts titled Punt & Pass Podcast and CampusLore Life. In March 2021, he was hired by Icon Source, a company helping college athletes receive student athlete compensation, as Executive Vice President.

References

External links
 Stats at ESPN
 Stats at NCAA
  Georgia Bulldogs bio

1989 births
Living people
People from Duluth, Georgia
People from Suwanee, Georgia
Sportspeople from the Atlanta metropolitan area
Players of American football from Georgia (U.S. state)
American football punters
Georgia Bulldogs football players
All-American college football players
Pittsburgh Steelers players
Chicago Bears players
Detroit Lions players
Arizona Cardinals players